Nicolae Simionescu (27 June 1926 – 6 February 1995) was a Romanian physician.

Born in Bucharest, he attended Dimitrie Cantemir and then Saint Andrew High School, graduating in 1944. He then enrolled in the medical faculty of the University of Bucharest, which he completed in 1950, earning his doctorate in 1966. From 1946 to 1970, he was on the staff of the same institution, rising from junior teaching assistant to teaching assistant to associate professor and department chairman. Meanwhile, he improved his skills as a surgeon until 1957, when he transferred to the Bucharest Endocrinology Institute. Working there until 1970, he conducted experimental and clinical research, functioning as head researcher in the morphology section. Relocating to the United States in 1970 with permission from the communist party, he worked under George Emil Palade, first at The Rockefeller University (1970–73) and then at Yale University (1973–74).

While abroad and following his return, he focused on the cellular and molecular biopathology of the cardiovascular system, with a focus on endothelin and atherosclerosis. In 1979, he founded, with the help of the communist party and the security services in which he was an active member, the Institute of Cellular Biology and Pathology, which bears his name since his death. His output includes over 600 articles, monographs, chapters and lectures delivered at international congresses. Although an active communist and member of the communist national security, two years after the revolution and fall of the communist regime, he became a titular member of the Romanian Academy in 1991, and died from an unknown cause in 1995.

His wife Maya Simionescu was a close scientific collaborator, and continues to dictate the institute being involved in the inside policies at some degree.

Notes

References
 Dr. Victor V. Jinga, in Ileana Mânduțeanu, Loredan Ștefan Niculescu, Maya Simionescu (eds.), Memento Nicolae Simionescu, p. 73–76. Bucharest, Institutul de Biologie și Patologie Celulară, 2009, 
 

1926 births
1995 deaths
Academic staff of the Carol Davila University of Medicine and Pharmacy
Romanian pathologists
Romanian surgeons
University of Bucharest alumni
Titular members of the Romanian Academy
20th-century surgeons